Minuscule 319 (in the Gregory-Aland numbering), α 256 (Soden), is a Greek minuscule manuscript of the New Testament, on parchment. Palaeographically it has been assigned to the 12th century. 
Formerly it was labelled by 24a and 29p.

Description 

The codex contains the text of the Acts of the Apostles, Catholic epistles, and Pauline epistles on 303 parchment leaves with lacunae (Acts 1:1-11; 18:20-20:14; James 5:14—1 Peter 1:4). Some other lacunae were supplied by modern hand. 
Some leaves of this manuscript are torn and decayed. There are also many changes by a later hand.

The text is written in one column per page, biblical text in 22 lines per page.

Text 

The Greek text of the codex is a representative of the Byzantine text-type. Aland placed it in Category V.

History 

Thomas Gale collated the manuscript for Mill (Cant. 2). It was examined Bentley, and John Wigley. C. R. Gregory saw it in 1883. Formerly it was labelled by 24a and 29p. In 1908 Gregory gave the number 319 to it.

The manuscript is currently housed at the Christ's College, Cambridge (GG. 1.9 (Ms. 9)) at Cambridge.

See also 

 List of New Testament minuscules
 Biblical manuscript
 Textual criticism

References

Further reading 

 F. H. A. Scrivener, An Exact Transcript of the Codex Augiensis (Cambridge and London, 1859), pp. 64-66.

External links 

 Images from Minuscule 319 at the CSNTM

Greek New Testament minuscules
12th-century biblical manuscripts